This is a list of lakes (including reservoirs) in Estonia.

Largest lakes

All lakes
List is incomplete

See also

External links

Estonia
Lakes